is the second major single from the Japanese pop group Cute, released on July 11, 2007 on the Zetima label. The limited edition features a DVD with the PV.

It is a danceable upbeat number.

The single debuted at number 5 in the Oricon Weekly Singles Chart, remaining in the chart for 4 weeks.

This song was being used in the anime  as the second opening song.

Track listing

Charts

Awards

Japan Cable Awards 

|-align="center"
| 2007
| align="center"| "Meguru Koi no Kisetsu"
| Cable Music Award
|

References

External links 
 Meguru Koi no Kisetsu entry on the Up-Front Works official website

2007 singles
Cute (Japanese idol group) songs
Japanese-language songs
Song recordings produced by Tsunku
Songs written by Tsunku
Zetima Records singles
2007 songs